The Rivers State Agricultural Development Programme is a government parastatal within the Ministry of Agriculture. It was established under the Law on the Agricultural Development Programme of Rivers State 1988. Its functions include formulating and implementing programmes relating to Agriculture as well as providing extension services to farmers in both rural and urban areas of the state.

Responsibilities
The Agricultural Development Programme has the following responsibilities:

Increasing food and tree crops, livestock and fisheries production of the small scale farmer and fishermen in Rivers State and consequently to raise their incomes.
Streamlining the extension services and the inputs to improve networks of rural roads.
Providing safe portable water supply to the rural population
Enhancing the capacity of the state to plan and implement similar programmes in the future.

Projects
National Programme on Food Security (NPFS)
Root and Tuber Expansion Programme(RTEP)
Pre-Emptive management of Cassava Mosaic Disease (CMD)
Community - Based Natural Resources Management Programme (CBNRMP)
National Fadama Development Programme (FADAMAIII)

See also
List of government agencies of Rivers State

References

External links
Agricultural Development Programme

ADP
Government agencies established in 1988
ADP
1988 establishments in Nigeria
1980s establishments in Rivers State